Prince Constantine Esperovich Beloselsky-Belozersky ( 1843 – 26 May 1920, Neuilly-sur-Seine) was a Russian general, landowner and horse breeder.

Biography 
He was born on 16 June 1843 to Prince Esper Alexandrovitch Beloselsky-Belozersky and Elena Pavlovna Bibikova (1812–1888). He received education at home and entered into service in the Chevalier Guard Regiment on 9 December 1861. Beloselsky-Belozersky held the ranks of Lt. Col. Army (1882), Colonel (1884), Major-General (1894), Lieutenant-General (1906) and Adjutant General (1906).

In 1866-1868 he served as adjutant chief of police. In 1868 Beloselsky-Belozersky retired, but in 1877 he returned to service. He served as ADC to the Chief of Staff of the Guards Corps (1877-1881).

Beloselsky-Belozersky participated in the Russo-Turkish War of 1877-1878. In 1881 he was for a short time adjutant to the Tsarevich, the future Emperor Alexander III.

In 1895 he went to the reserve, and in 1896 returned to service in the rank of major general on enrolling in a retinue of His Imperial Majesty. He was a member of the Board of the Main Directorate of horse breeding.

According to the newspaper "Vedomosti Exchange", in 1908 the Prince converted from Orthodoxy to Catholicism.

Beloselsky-Belozersky retired from service on 16 April 1917 due to illness.

After the Revolution he emigrated to France.

Beloselsky-Belozersky died on 26 May 1920 in Neuilly-sur-Seine.

Family 
He was married to Nadezhda Dmitrievna Skobeleva (1847-1920), sister of Gen. Mikhail Skobelev. Their children were: Sergei Belosselsky-Belozersky (1867-1951), Elena (1869-1944), Esper Konstantinovich Belosselsky-Belozersky(1871-1921), and Olga (1874-1923), who married Prince Vladimir Nikolayevich Orlov.

Awards 
 Order of St. Stanislas 3rd degree. (1867)
 Order of St. Anne's 3rd degree. (1879)
 Order of St. Anne's 2nd degree. (1887)
 Order of St. Vladimir 3rd century. (1890)
 Order of St. Stanislaus of the 1st degree. (1899)
 Order of St. Anne 1st degree. (1903)
 Order of St. Vladimir of the 2nd degree. (1907)
 Order of White Eagle (1912)
 Order of St. Alexander Nevsky (12/06/1914)
 Knight Grand Cross of the Royal Victorian Order (United Kingdom)
 Grand Officer of the Legion of Honor (France)

External links 
 starosti.ru
 tez-rus.net
 grwar.ru
 regiment.ru

Converts to Eastern Catholicism from Eastern Orthodoxy
Former Russian Orthodox Christians
Russian Eastern Catholics
Imperial Russian Army generals
Grand Officiers of the Légion d'honneur
Recipients of the Order of St. Vladimir, 2nd class
Recipients of the Order of Saint Stanislaus (Russian)
Russian princes
Russian emigrants to France
Honorary Knights Grand Cross of the Royal Victorian Order